Carazo may refer to:

Carazo (surname)
Carazo (department), Nicaragua
Carazo, Province of Burgos, a municipality in Castile and León, Spain